The Yalakom River is a tributary of the Bridge River, which is one of the principal tributaries of the Fraser River, entering it near the town of Lillooet, British Columbia.  In frontier times it was also known as the North Fork of the Bridge River, and joins the Bridge River proper at Moha, a rural community with a history in ranching, farming and mining.  The river is approximately 50km (30 mi) in length.  The valley's climate is semi-arid in character and lodgepole pine predominates below treeline.

The name Yalakom comes from the Statimc language word for the ewe of the mountain sheep and is also applied to one of the major peaks of the Camelsfoot Range, which rises along the east bank of the Yalakom.  West of the river is the Shulaps Range, which is similarly named for the ram of the mountain sheep in Statimc.  The upper part of the valley's east bank, in the area of Yalakom Mountain, had been for many years a wildlife preserve and the area remains rich in game.

The rural farming and ranching community of Moha is located at the confluence of the Yalakom and Bridge Rivers, at the mouth of the Big Canyon of the latter river.  Copper prospects at Poison Mountain and Red Mountain at the head of the valley remain undeveloped, although there is a major reactivated gold claim on the flanks of Big Dog Mountain to their southwest at the head of the Shulaps Range.

The yalakom River watershed is located within The British Columbian Wildlife Management Unit number 3-32 as depicted in the B.C
Data Catalogue Wildlife Management Units.
Published by the Ministry of Forests, Lands, Natural Resource Operations and Rural Development - Fish, Wildlife and Habitat Management and Licensed under Open Government License - British Columbia.

And within the B.C. Hunting & Trapping Regulations Synopsis which is published for the ministry of Forests lands and natural operations By Munday Tourism Publications . These M.U. boundaries are approximate only. For a more precise definition consult the BC Recreational Atlas, 6th edition.

  *Indigenous Fur Bearing Animals within the Yalakom Watershed; 
    Canines; Wolf, Coyote, Red Fox, Cross Fox.
    Felions; Cougar, Lynx, Bobcat.
    Weasel Clan; Wolverine, Fisher, Coastal Marten, Ermine.
    Rodents; Beaver, Red Squirrel Flying Squirrel.
    Procyonidae; Racoon.
    Bears; Grizzly, Black Bears of Various colour fazes
  
  *Indigenous Game Animals Within the Yalakom Watershed;
    Deer (Cervidae); Moose, Mule Deer. 
    Bovids (Bovidae); Mountain Goat, California Bighorn Sheep.
    All of the Fur Bearing list above are Yalakom inhabitants 

   *Indigenous Upland Game Birds Within the Yalakom Watershed;
     Grouse; Blue Grouse /(Dusty of the interior), Spruce Grouse, Ruffed Grouse,
     Ptarmigan; Rock Ptarmigan, 

   *Miscellaneous other Indigenous rare fauna within the Yalakom Watershed;
     American Pygmy Shrew (Sorex hoyi Baird, 1858), One was brought into the Ministry of Wildlife 
department branch in Surrey B.C. where a Ministry Wildlife Biologist Identified it as the Pygmy Shrew. This specimen came from near Rataskit Creek about a mile West of the Yalakom River. 
     Boreal Owl (Aegolius funereus) One was brought into the Ministry of Wildlife department Branch in 
Surrey B.C. Where a Ministry Wildlife Biologist Identified it as a Boreal Owl. This specimen came 
from Big Dog Mountain Within the Yalakom Drainage.

References

https://www2.gov.bc.ca/assets/gov/sports-recreation-arts-and-culture/outdoor-recreation/fishing-and-hunting/hunting/regulations/2016-2018/hunting-trapping-synopsis-2016-2018-region3.pdf
BC Names/GeoBC entry "Yalakom River"
https://www2.gov.bc.ca/assets/gov/sports-recreation-arts-and-culture/outdoor-recreation/fishing-and-hunting/hunting/regulations/2016-2018/hunting-trapping-synopsis-2016-2018-trapping.pdf
https://catalogue.data.gov.bc.ca/dataset/wildlife-management-units
http://a100.gov.bc.ca/pub/eswp/speciesSummary.do;jsessionid=KNZdWLZB15qwJSdd0yhLqhlLvvh2rmvB02xT0QPRSgSdQ8tw31dy!678712255?id=16982
http://www.birdatlas.bc.ca/accounts/speciesaccount.jsp?lang=en&sp=BOOW

External links
View of the Yalakom valley, looking northwest from Moha from Randall & Kat's flying Photos

Rivers of the Pacific Ranges
Bridge River Country
Lillooet Country